Lake Sidenreng is a lake in Sulawesi Selatan, Indonesia. This lake is connected to Tempe Lake via a small channel. Lake Sidenreng has some water facilities. The location is surrounded by mountains.

References

Lakes of Sulawesi
Landforms of South Sulawesi